Hechtia schottii is a species of flowering plant in the Bromeliaceae family. This species is native to Mexico.

References

schottii
Flora of Mexico
Taxa named by John Gilbert Baker